The Sf. Iosif Roman Catholic Theological Institute is a private university, with a Roman Catholic character and liturgical tradition, in Iaşi, Romania, founded in 1886.

Structure
 Faculty of Roman Catholic Theology

References

External links
 Official site

Seminaries and theological colleges in Romania
Universities in Iași
Educational institutions established in 1886
1886 establishments in Romania